Debesh Roy (17 December 1936 — 14 May 2020) was a Bengali writer and scholar from India. He is best known for his Sahitya Akademi Award-winning novel Teesta Parer Brittanta (1990).

Early life and education 
Roy was born in Pabna in British India. His family came to Jalpaiguri on 17 December 1936. His father was Khistish Roy and his mother was Aparna Roy. He had his schooling from Ananda Model School, Jalpaiguri. He graduated from Ananda Chandra College in Jalpaiguri. From the time he was a student, Roy worked in the student wing of Communist Party of India. During his such association, he learned the Rajbanshi dialect. In 1956, while studying at Calcutta University, he took part in mainstream left-wing politics.

Career 
Roy was also involved with the trade union movement in Kolkata. He worked as a research fellow in the Centre for Studies in Social Science. He made his debut in the literary scene in 1955 in Desh magazine. His first book was Jajati. During his five decades-long writing career, Roy was remembered for numerous books, including Borisaler Jogen Mondal, Manush Khun Kore Keno, Samay Asamayer Brittanto, and Lagan Gandhar. Roy's life and works were inspired by the Teesta river-based Rajbanshi Community of North Bengal. He received the Sahitya Academy award in 1990 for his epic novel Teesta Parer Brittanto. He was also honoured by Bhasa Sahitya Parishad and Bhualka Purashkar.

Publications 
 Jajati
 Teesta Parer Brittanto
 Borisaler Jogen Mondal
 Manush Khun Kore Keno
 Samay Asamayer Brittanto
 Lagan Gandhar
 Attiyo Brittanto
 Mafassali Brittanto
 Tistapuran
 Angina
 Itihaser Lokjon
 Udbasu

Death
Roy suffered a massive cardiac arrest and died on 14 May 2020 at a private hospital in Kolkata.

References

1936 births
2020 deaths
Bengali writers
Bengali-language writers
Recipients of the Sahitya Akademi Award in Bengali
Novelists from West Bengal
20th-century Indian novelists
People from Jalpaiguri
 Writers from Kolkata